Dghine Benali (Arabic: بن علي بودغن; May 5, 1934 – March 27, 1960), commonly known as Colonel Lotfi, was born on 5 May 1934 in Tlemcen in Algeria.
Benali was an Algerian leader in the Algerian War, organising the Wilaya V from 1958 to 1960.
He first worked as a Political leader with the National Liberation Front then moved to fighting in battlefield; he was killed in Béchar by French troops in 1960

Biography
He was born on May 7, 1934 in Tlemcen in western Algeria.

Joining the Liberation Front
He joined the National Liberation Front at an early age and he could handle all the responsibilities as a young member very well and had a good reputation among other members until he decided to move to fight in battlefield.

Death
Colonel Lotfi died in an unfair battle against french troops on March 27, 1960 two years before independence in a mountain in eastern Béchar.

Legacy
He is considered a national hero in Algeria.
The airport of Béchar, Boudghene Ben Ali Lotfi Airport was named after him.
A movie was produced with the name of "Lotfi"  narrating his story and struggle against French rule in Algeria.
In Oran one of the biggest streets in the city has his name; a high school there is named after him.

See also
French rule in Algeria
History of Algeria
Provinces of Algeria
Algerian War

References

External links
War in Algeria: the French experience

1934 births
1960 deaths
People from Tlemcen
Movement for the Triumph of Democratic Liberties politicians
Members of the National Liberation Front (Algeria)
People of the Algerian War
Algerian guerrillas killed in action